Annmarie Morais (born 1973 in Jamaica) is a Jamaican-Canadian screenwriter best known for writing the film How She Move. She earned a BFA from York University in Film and Video in 1995.

Morais won funding for two Vision TV Cultural Diversity Drama Competition movies: Hotel Babylon and Da Kink in My Hair, which aired on Vision in 2004 and 2005. Hotel Babylon is the story of immigrants working in a hotel in Winnipeg, Canada.  Kink was adapted from the Trey Anthony play about a beauty parlour in a Jamaican-Canadian neighbourhood. Morais was also a writer and story editor on the television series adapted from the play, which aired on Global in 2007.

Nicholl Prize
Morais was the first Canadian to win the prestigious Nicholl Fellowship in Screenwriting. She was also the first person to win the Nicholl with a resubmitted script. Bleeding was a finalist in 1998, and she resubmitted it without changes in 1999.
The prize, administered by the Academy of Motion Picture Arts & Sciences, garnered Morais $25,000.

How She Move
While at York, Morais had produced a short documentary Steppin on step-dancing in Toronto's Jane-Finch neighborhood. In 2004, she received Telefilm financing to produce a feature film based on the same concept. Originally titled Step, the film How She Move was accepted into the 2007 Sundance Film Festival. At Sundance, a bidding war resulted in a $3.4 million offer from Paramount and MTV Films.
 The film received wide release in the United States and Canada in January 2007.

Current projects
Splitting her time between Los Angeles and Toronto, Morais has created a television show for ABC Family about high-school cheerleaders, called The Flip Side. She is also writing a thriller set in London, The Collectors to be directed by fellow Jamaican-Canadian Clement Virgo and adapting Jane Finlay-Young's novel From Bruised Fell.

References

Sources
 Brantford screenwriter hits it big Brantford Expositor February 1, 2008
 Sundance interview

External links
 
 
 Nicholl Fellowships

21st-century Canadian screenwriters
Canadian women screenwriters
1973 births
Living people
Writers from Toronto
Jamaican emigrants to Canada
Black Canadian writers
Black Canadian women
21st-century Canadian women writers